Forastera is the primary name or synonym of several wine and table grape varieties including:

Forastera, grown on the islands of Ischia and Procida in the Campania region of southern Italy
Forastera (Spanish grape), grown in the Canary Islands
Chelva, Spanish grape that is also known as Forastera blanca and Mantuo grown in the Extremadura region
Doradilla, Spanish grape that is also known as Forastera blanca that is grown in the Malaga region of Andalucia